Dotti is a chain of fashion stores in Australia and New Zealand, selling apparel and accessories. It was acquired by the Just Group in 2004. It markets itself as a fast fashion brand. Their target group is young female adults aged 18 to 28.

History
Dotti was founded by Raymond Levis and Linda Bowen in Sydney in 1981. The name "Dotti" may have been inspirer by Linda's mother Dorothy, or Via Condotti, a street in Rome known for its fashion stores.

In 2004 the Dotti chain became a part of The Just Group and began expanding throughout Australia and New Zealand. It opened its 100th store in December 2009.

Stores
On 12 December 2009, Dotti opened its 100th store in a shopping centre in Melbourne's western suburbs. By 2017 they har 220 stores, 198 in Australia and 22 in New Zealand. 

In April 2011, Dotti launched an online store, adding a New Zealand specific online shopping site in 2015.

References

External links
Dotti Official

Clothing retailers of Australia
Clothing retailers of New Zealand
Companies based in Sydney
Retail companies established in 1981
2004 mergers and acquisitions
1981 establishments in Australia